The 1985 Giro d'Italia was the 68th edition of the Giro d'Italia, one of cycling's Grand Tours. The field consisted of 180 riders, and 135 riders finished the race.

By rider

By nationality

References

1985 Giro d'Italia
1985